Pett Kata Shaw is a 2022 Bangladeshi horror web series. It is written and directed by Nuhash Humayun. The series was released on online video-on-demand platform Chorki. Sohail Mondal, Shirin Akter Shila, Afzal Hossain, Chanchal Chowdhury, Pritom Hasan and Novera Rahman acted in the lead roles. The series is a modern retelling of the most shadowy and sensational scenes of traditional Bengali folktales passed down from generation to generation.

It will have its international premiere as part of the official selection at the International Film Festival Rotterdam in 2023.

Cast
 Shohel Mondol - Hasan
 Shirin Akter Shila - The ghost 
 Ekram Khan Emu
 Durjoy Roy
 Witness Shahid
 Soumik Bose
 Afzal Hossain
 Chanchal Chowdhury
 Quazi Nawshaba Ahmed
 Khaled Ahmed Rumi
 Momo Ali
 Maymuna Islam Medha
 Mohana Hossain
 Morshed Mishu
 Saida Taslima Hasan Nodi
 Pranay Dev Uchshas
 Taufiqul Iman
 Gitshree Chowdhury
 Pritam Hasan
 Masuda Khan
 Novera Rahman
 Nabil Nasser
 Abir
 Hussain
 Murtaza Zubair

Episodes

Reception
Shah Nahian of The Business Standard criticised its first episode but praised the storytelling ability and music of the web series. Fatin Hamama from The Daily Star said, "All things considered, Pett Kata Shaw definitely did reinvent Bangladeshi horror, a genre that's been woefully under-explored until now".

References

External links
 
 
 

2022 web series debuts
2022 web series endings
Bangladeshi web series
Bengali-language web series
Horror fiction web series
Chorki original programming